Bolívar Ruiz (born 29 April 1958) is an Ecuadorian footballer. He played in two matches for the Ecuador national football team in 1983. He was also part of Ecuador's squad for the 1983 Copa América tournament.

References

1958 births
Living people
Ecuadorian footballers
Ecuador international footballers
Association football midfielders
People from Cotacachi (city)